The 2012 season was the Carolina Panthers' 18th in the National Football League and their second under head coach Ron Rivera. A day after the Panthers loss to the Dallas Cowboys, general manager Marty Hurney was fired. Until a new general manager was hired (that hire eventually being Dave Gettleman), director of football operations Brandon Beane served as interim GM. In a statistical rarity, the team lost the first 13 of their game-opening coin tosses, an event with a 1 in 8,192 probability. In the 13th game, the Panthers asked fans on Facebook to make the call, but the vote ended in a 50/50 tie.

Logo change
The new logo would subsequently be added to the team's uniforms, around the stadium and on merchandise.

2012 draft class

The Panthers did not have a 3rd round selection.

NOTES
 The team traded its third-round selection to the Chicago Bears in exchange for TE Greg Olsen.

 The Panthers finished with the same record and strength of schedule as the Miami Dolphins.  This selection is the 9th, based on a coin toss at the NFL Scouting Combine won by Miami in March.

 The Panthers finished with the same record and strength of schedule as the Miami Dolphins.  This selection is the 40th, based on a coin toss at the NFL Scouting Combine in March won by the Miami Dolphins.

 The team traded its sixth-round selection (#180) and their third-round selection in 2013 to the San Francisco 49ers in exchange for their fourth-round selection (#103).

} The Panthers received one compensatory pick for the 207 pick overall.

Season Summary
Looking to improve off of a 6–10 season from rookie coach Ron Rivera and quarterback Cam Newton, the Panthers got off to a tough start. The Panthers began the season with a dismal 2–8 record through their first 10 games. The Panthers played competitively throughout most games the entire season with an exception of a 36–7 loss to the defending Super Bowl Champion New York Giants where the Panthers fell to a 20–0 deficit early in the game and could not recover. Many would turn to a victory on November 26 in a prime time match up against the struggling Philadelphia Eagles as the turning point in the season for the Panthers. With that win on Monday Night Football, the Panthers would go on to win 5 of their remaining 6 games, rattling off 4 victories in a row to finish the season, with one victory coming against the NFC's #1 seed Atlanta Falcons, the first win in the series for the Panthers since the 2009 season.

Staff

Final roster

Schedule

Preseason

Regular season

Note: Intra-division opponents are in bold text.

Game summaries

Week 1: at Tampa Bay Buccaneers

The Panthers started the season at 0–1 picking up their 4th straight regular season opening loss.  Also, the team dropped to 0–11 in games where starting QB Cam Newton turns the ball over as he was picked off twice.

Week 2: vs. New Orleans Saints

With the win, the Panthers improved to 1–1, snapping their 4-game losing streak against the Saints.  Also, the team improved to 1–11 in games where Newton has at least 1 turnover.

Week 3: vs. New York Giants

With the huge loss on Thursday Night Football, the Panthers fell to 1–2.  The team also dropped to 1–12 in games where Cam Newton has at least 1 turnover.

Week 4: at Atlanta Falcons

With their 5th straight loss to the Falcons, the Panthers fell to 1–3.  Also, for the first time the team lost a game after Newton did not record a turnover.

Week 5: vs. Seattle Seahawks

With the loss, the Panthers head into their bye week at 1–4.  Also, the team dropped to 1–13 in games where Newton has a least a turnover.

Week 7: vs. Dallas Cowboys

With the loss, the Panthers fell to 1–5 and also to 1–14 in games when Newton records a turnover.

Week 8: at Chicago Bears

With the surprising loss, the Panthers dropped to 1–6.  Also, the team moves to 1–15 in games where Newton has a turnover.

Week 9: at Washington Redskins

With the win, the Panthers improved to 2–6.  The team also improves to 7–1 in games where Newton does not turn the ball over.

Week 10: vs. Denver Broncos

With the loss, the Panthers fell to 2–7.  The team also drops to 1–16 in games where Newton has a turnover.

Week 11: vs. Tampa Bay Buccaneers

With the loss, the Panthers fell to 2–8.  Also, QB Cam Newton suffered being swept by all 3 division rival teams as the team dropped to 7–2 in games where he does not have a turnover.

Week 12: at Philadelphia Eagles

With the win the Panthers improved to 3–8 and also 8–2 in games where Newton does not have a turnover.

Week 13: at Kansas City Chiefs

With the loss, the Panthers dropped to 3–9 securing them their 3rd straight losing season and also the team dropped in records to 0–2 against the AFC West and then to a record of 8–3 when Newton does not turn the ball over.

Week 14: vs. Atlanta Falcons

With the surprising win, the Panthers improved to 4–9 and snapped their 5-game losing streak to the Falcons.  Also, the team improved to 9–3 in games where Newton does not have a turnover.

Week 15: at San Diego Chargers

With the win, the Panthers improved to 5–9 and 10–3 when Newton does not have a turnover.  It also leaves the Panthers 1–2 against the AFC West.

Week 16: vs. Oakland Raiders

With the win, the Panthers improved to 6–9 and 2–16 when Newton turns the ball over at least once.  Also, the team finished the season 2–2 against the AFC West.

Week 17: at New Orleans Saints

With the win the Panthers finished 7–9 and good enough for 2nd place in the NFC South, sweeping the Saints for the first time since 2008.  Also, the team improved to 3–16 in games when Newton has a turnover.  Also, Newton was one touchdown shy of being a 4th QB  to have at least 20 passing touchdowns in his first 2 seasons as his total record of passing touchdowns stood at 19 while his rushing touchdowns stood at 8 leaving him with a failed improvement finishing with 27 total touchdowns.

Standings

References

External links
 

Carolina
Carolina Panthers seasons
Carolina